Mohanbhai Dhanjibhai Dhodia (born 1 June 1957) is an Indian politician representing the Bharatiya Janata Party (BJP). He is currently serving as a member of Legislative Assembly from Mahuva constituency in the Surat district, Gujarat for its 12th Legislative assembly.

Early life
Mohanbhai Dhodia was born on 1 June 1957 into a Schedule Tribe family and belongs to BJP. He was elected as a member of Surat District Panchayat in 1995 and in 2001 was made opposition leader in Surat District Panchayat (SDP).

Political Highlights

Mohanbhai Dhodia was first elected to Vidhan Sabha from Mahuva Surat(ST) Gujarat in 2002. He received a ticket from the Mahuva Surat(ST) again in 2007 but he lost. In 2012 he received a ticket from the Mahuva Surat(ST) and won.

References

Living people
Bharatiya Janata Party politicians from Gujarat
Gujarat MLAs 2002–2007
Gujarat MLAs 2012–2017
1957 births
Gujarat MLAs 2017–2022